Rise Above may refer to:

Music
 Rise Above Records, an English independent record label

Albums
 Rise Above (Dirty Projectors album), 2007
 Rise Above (Epic Soundtracks album), 1992
 Rise Above (For Felix album), 2004
 Rise Above (JK Flesh album), 2016
 Rise Above (Oysterband album), 2002
 Rise Above: 24 Black Flag Songs to Benefit the West Memphis Three, a 2002 album by the American rock band Rollins Band

Songs
 "Rise Above", a song from the 2011 rock musical Spider-Man: Turn Off the Dark, released as the single "Rise Above 1"
 "Rise Above", a 1981 song by American hardcore punk band Black Flag from the album Damaged 
 "Rise Above", a 2004 song by Afro Celt Sound System from the album Pod

Other
 Rise Above Movement, an American nationalist organisation